In mathematics, the Vitali–Hahn–Saks theorem, introduced by  , , and , proves that under some conditions a sequence of measures converging point-wise does so uniformly and the limit is also a measure.

Statement of the theorem

Preliminaries

Given a measure space  a distance can be constructed on  the set of measurable sets  with  This is done by defining 
 where  is the symmetric difference of the sets 
This gives rise to a metric space  by identifying two sets  when  Thus a point  with representative  is the set of all  such that 

Proposition:  with the metric defined above is a complete metric space.

Proof: Let 

Then

This means that the metric space  can be identified with a subset of the Banach space .

Let , with

Proof of Vitali-Hahn-Saks theorem

Moreover  is continuous. 

For every  the set

 implies 
Thus, if  and  then

By the additivity of the limit it follows that  is finitely-additive. Then, since  it follows that  is actually countably additive.

References

Theorems in measure theory